Dawson is a masculine given name which may refer to:

People
Dawson Bates (1876–1949), Northern Irish politician
Dawson Buckley (1917–1993), Australian rugby league player
Dawson Burns (1828–1909), English minister and temperance activist
Dawson Charlie (–1908), Canadian First Nation person and gold discoverer
Dawson Cram (born 2001), American stock car racing driver
Dawson Dawson-Walker (1868–1934), British clergyman, classicist, theologian, and academic
Dawson Dawson-Watson (1864–1939), British painter
Dawson Deaton (born 1999), American football player
Dawson Devoy (born 2001) Irish association football player
Dawson Dunbar (born 1999), Canadian actor
Dawson Engler, American computer scientist and professor
Dawson Fernandes (born 1990), Indian footballer
Dawson Garcia (born 2001), American basketball player
Dawson Gurley (born 1993), American YouTube personality
Dawson Harron (1921–1988), English cricketer
Dawson Hodgson (born 1978), American politician
Dawson Knox (born 1996), American football player
Dawson L. Kilgore (1823–1893), American politician
Dawson Mathis (1940–2017), American politician from Georgia
Dawson McAllister (1946-2020), American speaker, radio host, and author
Dawson McCartney (born 1998), American soccer player
Dawson Mercer (born 2001), Canadian ice hockey player
Dawson Millward (1870–1926), British actor
Dawson Murschell (born 1995), Canadian darts player
Dawson Odums, American football coach
Dawson Ritchie (1920–1994), New Zealand cricketer
Dawson Sheppard (1866–1953), Royal Navy officer
Dawson Simpson (born 1989), Australian rules footballer
Dawson Stelfox (born 1958), Northern Ireland architect
Dawson Trotman (1906–1956), American evangelist
Dawson Turner (1775–1858), English banker, botanist and antiquary
Dawson Turner (radiologist) (1857–1928), British pioneer of radiology
Dawson Turner (rugby union) (1846–1909), English rugby union player, grandson of the above Dawson Turner
Dawson Walker (1916–1973), Scottish football manager
Dawson Williams (1854–1928), British physician

Fictional characters
Dawson, in Thomas & Friends
Dawson Leery, on the TV show Dawson's Creek

Masculine given names